Laura Matilda Towne (May 3, 1825 in Pittsburgh, Pennsylvania – February 22, 1901, in St. Helena Island, South Carolina) was an American abolitionist and educator. She is best known for forming the first freedmen's schools (those for newly freed slaves), notably the Penn School.

Early life 

Laura Matilda Towne, the daughter of John Towne and Sarah Robinson was born on May 3, 1825, in Pittsburgh, Pennsylvania.

Education & influences 
Laura Towne originally studied medicine when the American Civil War broke out.

She was raised in Philadelphia hearing sermons about the abolition of slavery by her minister, William Henry Furness at the First Unitarian Church of Philadelphia. Influenced by these teachings, Towne answered the call for volunteers when the Union captured Port Royal and other Sea Islands area of South Carolina. With the help of her Quaker friend Ellen Murray (January 31, 1834 – April 7, 1908) they founded the Penn Center on St. Helena Island, the first school for newly freed slaves in the United States.

Laura Towne was buried at the Laurel Hill Cemetery, Section 7, Lot 77 to 80, in Philadelphia.

The Penn Center 

The school started with nine students and operated out of the back room of a plantation house. Laura Towne and Murray spent the next forty years of their lives ministering to the freed slaves, developing their trust, providing them with medical care, teaching them to read and write, and fighting for their land rights. Laura Towne and Ellen Murray eventually adopted several African American children and raised them as their own.

She took care of the school for the rest of her life and eventually gave up practicing medicine. After her death, Penn School was transferred to Hampton Institute, at which time it began operating as the Penn Normal, Industrial, and Agricultural School.

Recognized as a National Historic Landmark, the Penn Center trained generations of students, including U.S. Congressman Robert Smalls (1839-1915). During the Civil Rights era the Penn Center served as a training ground for non-violent civil disobedience by welcoming Rev. Dr. Martin Luther King Jr. Now a National Historic Landmark, the Penn Center celebrated 150 years education, leadership and service.

Sources

 Laura Towne:Biography
 About

References

Further reading 
 
 
 
 

1825 births
1901 deaths
People from Pittsburgh
American women educators
American Unitarians
Burials at Laurel Hill Cemetery (Philadelphia)
People from Saint Helena Island, South Carolina